The first season of Esta historia me suena (shown on screen as Esta historia me suena: Vol. 1), a Mexican anthology drama television series created and developed by Televisa and broadcast on Las Estrellas it premiered on 13 May 2019 and ended on 28 June 2019, and the first season consists of thirty one-hour episodes. The entire season is available via streaming on Blim (now known as Blim TV).

Each episode of the first season is presented by the singer María José and the actor Jan Carlo Bautista.

Notable guest stars 

 Jorge Aravena
 Daniela Aedo
 Lilia Aragón
 Eugenia Cauduro
 Axel Muñiz
 Yankel Stevan 
 Malillany Marín
 Harry Geithner
 Sandra Itzel
 Sabine Moussier
 Víctor Noriega
 Luciano Zacharski
 Maribel Fernández
 Fran Meric
 Ana Bertha Espín
 Nuria Bages
 Agustín Arana
 Tania Lizardo
 Amairani
 Luis Bayardo
 Cecilia Gabriela
 Adrián Di Monte
 Raquel Olmedo
 Lourdes Reyes
 Manuel "Flaco" Ibáñez
 Fabián Robles
 Diana Golden
 Alexis Ayala
 Aura Cristina Geithner
 Julio Mannino
 Andrea Lagunes
 Anna Ciocchetti
 Ivonne Montero
 Mar Contreras
 Luis Gatica
 Juan Ángel Esparza

Episodes

Notes

References 

2019 Mexican television seasons